Jamie Barclay (born 26 September 1989) is a Scottish footballer who plays as a goalkeeper for West of Scotland Premier Division side Cumnock Juniors.

Barclay has previously played for Falkirk, Partick Thistle, Berwick Rangers, Clyde, Stenhousemuir, Dumbarton and East Stirlingshire, He has also played international football for the Scotland U21 side.

In September 2016, Barclay signed for East Stirlingshire, on a short-term deal until the opening of the next transfer window but agreed to remain with the club on 14 December 2016.. Barclay was named as club captain in February 2019 after Danny Ashe signed a pre-contract agreement with Lowland League rivals Kelty Hearts.

After 4 years with East Stirlingshire, Barclay decided to leave the club in May 2020 and later signed for Kilwinning Rangers in June.  After the West of Scotland Football League season was declared null and void, Barclay joined Dumbarton on an emergency loan in April 2021 - but did not make an appearance for the club.

After two seasons at the Buffs, Barclay left to join rival Premier Division club Cumnock Juniors.

Honours

Kilwinning Rangers
Eglinton Cup: Winner 2021-22

References

External links

1989 births
Scottish footballers
Dumbarton F.C. players
Falkirk F.C. players
East Stirlingshire F.C. players
Clyde F.C. players
Berwick Rangers F.C. players
Stenhousemuir F.C. players
Scottish Football League players
Living people
Partick Thistle F.C. players
Association football goalkeepers
Scotland under-21 international footballers
West of Scotland Football League players
Cumnock Juniors F.C. players